Khaliif Faarax Xayir (Af Soomaali: Khaliif Faarax Xayir) is a young Somali poet who uses Geeraar style of poetry.

Hayir or Khaliif Xayir, as he is known in AF Somali often creates patriotic poems as well as poems addressing various Somali social issues. Khalif's poems are so far available only in Af Somali. His latest poem was one he contributed to "Greeted Chain" poems meeting held in Abudwak and broadcast on Radio Abudwak.

Since 2008, Hayir created poems much appreciated inside Somalia and Somalis in diaspora in 
North America and Europe. Hearbroken (Af Soomaali: Qarracan) was the poem that made Khalif a young famous poet across Somalia.

Works
He wrote the following two poems highlighting the devastating 2011 drought which hit Somalia. The drought was the severest in 60 years.

1. Heartbroken Qarracan 
2. Goodbye Poem Dardaaran Gabay

Hayir participated a form of poetry called "chain poetry" in AF Somali as number of poets comment recited poem by adding their own version of the story in the form of an answer by denouncing or given a general comment on the recited poem. This contained 12 poems by different poets and its name is "Greeted Chain" or Silsiladii Salaamanay in Af Somalia.

References

Somalian poets